Han Xue, Hanxue, or variation, may refer to:

 Han Xue (swimmer) (韓雪, born 1981), Chinese Swimmer
 Han Xue (actress) (韩雪, born 1983), Chinese Singer and actress
 Han learning or Hanxue

See also

 Xue
 Han (disambiguation)
 Han Xu (disambiguation)
 Han shu (disambiguation)